Copake Falls is a hamlet and census-designated place (CDP) in Columbia County, New York, United States. The CDP was designated after the 2010 census, so no population figure is yet available.

The former Copake Falls Methodist Episcopal Church was added to the National Register of Historic Places in 2012.

Geography
Copake Falls is located along Bashbish Brook at the western foot of the Taconic Mountains, a range that runs along the New York-Massachusetts border.

A portion of the hamlet comprises the Copake Iron Works Historic District, part of the National Register of Historic Places.

New York State Route 22 forms the western edge of the Copake Falls CDP and leads north  to Hillsdale and south  to Copake hamlet.

Demographics

See also
Copake Iron Works Historic District
Taconic State Park

References

External links
Taconic State Park - Copake Falls Area

Census-designated places in New York (state)
Census-designated places in Columbia County, New York
Hamlets in New York (state)
Hamlets in Columbia County, New York